The Eureka E.P. is the third E.P. album by Memphis indie rock band The Grifters. Tripp Lamkins' liner notes state the reason for an EP instead of a full-length album:
"Well, after much touring, little band practice, a new young'un, 38 more Pavement comparisons, & the inevitable demise of the flower shop van, we bring you-an e.p. Hope no one feels slighted, but having 6 or 7 fewer songs to tear our greying hair out over will probably keep us together a long while. It was a pretty good year though. Touring with bands like Rodan(r.i.p.), Ruby Falls, Dambuilders, The Strapping Fieldhands, GBV, Ed Hall, Versus, Red Red Meat, & Jawbox kind of makes being away from Memphis worthwhile not to mention getting to meet so many good people all over the world. We sincerely love you and look forward to seeing you all again this year. And we will. Maybe we'll even have that lunch we're always talking about."

Also explained is the peculiar recording location of the album:

This recording is not only brought to you by Shangri-La Records again, but it was recorded there on 4-track. Once again it was sweetened at Easley studios by Doug & Davis.

Track listing

Album credits

Grifters
 Stanley Gallimore
 Tripp Lamkins
 Dave Shouse
 Scott Taylor

Additional musicians
 John Stivers (Impala) - Guitar on Founder's Day
 Melissa Dunn - Backing Vocals on X-Ray
 Roy Berry (The Simple Ones) - Percussion on Banjo
 Doug Easley - Slide Guitar on Eureka I.V.

Additional credits
 Settlement of Cover Concept Dispute by GBV
 Layout by Paul Ringger Jr.
 Disc Art by Johnny Taylor
 Photography by Dan Ball

References

Grifters (band) albums
1995 EPs